Mimosa tenuiflora, syn. Mimosa hostilis, also known as jurema preta, calumbi (Brazil), tepezcohuite (México), carbonal, cabrera, jurema, black jurema, and binho de jurema, is a perennial tree or shrub native to the northeastern region of Brazil (Paraíba, Rio Grande do Norte, Ceará, Pernambuco, Bahia) and found as far north as southern Mexico (Oaxaca and coast of Chiapas), and the following countries: El Salvador, Honduras, Panama, Colombia and Venezuela.

Description
In the Northern Hemisphere it blossoms and produces fruit from November to June or July. In the Southern Hemisphere it blooms primarily from September to January. There are about 145 seeds/. In the Southern Hemisphere, the fruit ripens from February to April.

The tree's bark is dark brown to gray.  It splits lengthwise and the inside is reddish brown.

The tree's wood is dark reddish brown with a yellow center.

Mimosa tenuiflora does very well after a forest fire, or other major ecological disturbance.  It is a prolific pioneer plant.  It drops its leaves on the ground, continuously forming a thin layer of mulch and eventually humus.  Along with its ability to fix nitrogen, the tree conditions the soil, making it ready for other plant species to come along.

Medicinal uses 

A tea made of the leaves and stem has been used to treat tooth pain.  For cases of cough and bronchitis, a water extract (decoction) of Mimosa tenuiflora is drunk.  A handful of bark in one liter of water is used by itself or in a syrup.  The solution is drunk until the symptoms subside.

One preliminary clinical study found Mimosa tenuiflora to be effective in treating venous leg ulcerations.

Aqueous extracts of Mimosa are widely used for wound healing and burns in Middle and South America. Consequently, the products of the plant (generally grouped under the term "Tepezcohuite") have become a popular and easily produced cosmetic ingredient in commercial skincare products, used and marketed by celebrities including Kylie Jenner and Salma Hayek.

Other uses 

The tree is an acceptable source of forage or fodder for animals, providing vital protein and other nutrients.  It does well in the dry season and in drought, while providing life saving food for local livestock and animals.  Cows, goats and sheep eat the pods and leaves.  There seems to be evidence that Mimosa tenuiflora forage or fodder cause development defects to pregnant ruminants in Brazil.

The tree is an important source of forage for bees, especially during the dry season and in the beginning of the wet season.

Like most plants in the family Fabaceae, Mimosa tenuiflora fertilizes the soil via nitrogen fixing bacteria.  The tree is useful in fighting soil erosion and for reforestation.

Mimosa tenuiflora is a very good source of fuel wood and works very well for making posts, most likely because of its high tannin content (16%), which protects it from rot.  Due to its high tannin content, the bark of the tree is widely used as a natural dye and in leather production.  It is used to make bridges, buildings, fences, furniture and wheels.  It is an excellent source of charcoal and at least one study has been done to see why this is the case.

The healing properties of the tree make it useful in treating domestic animals.  A solution of the leaves or bark can also be used for washing animals in the prevention of parasites.  Because the tree keeps most of its leaves during the dry season, it is an important source of shade for animals and plants during that time.

Chemistry
The bark is known to be rich in tannins, saponins, alkaloids, lipids, phytosterols, glucosides, xylose, rhamnose, arabinose, lupeol, methoxychalcones, and kukulkanins.  Additionally, Mimosa hostilis contains labdane diterpenoids.

Entheogenic uses 
[[File:Mimosa tenuiflora — João de Deus Medeiros 003.jpg|thumb|right|Mimosa tenuiflora''' syn. Mimosa hostilis]]Mimosa tenuiflora is an entheogen used by the Jurema Cult (O Culto da Jurema) in northeastern Brazil. Dried Mexican Mimosa tenuiflora root bark has been recently shown to have a dimethyltryptamine (DMT) content of about 1-1.7%.  The stem bark has about 0.03% DMT.

The parts of the tree are traditionally used in northeastern Brazil in a psychoactive decoction also called Jurema or Yurema. Analogously, the traditional Western Amazonian sacrament Ayahuasca is brewed from indigenous ayahuasca vines.
However, to date no β-carbolines such as harmala alkaloids have been detected in Mimosa tenuiflora decoctions, yet the Jurema is used in combination with several plants.MOTA, Clarice Novaes da; ALBUQUERQUE, Ulysses P.. "As muitas faces da Jurema: de espécie botânica à divindade afro-indígena." Recife: Bagaço (2002).CAMARGO, Maria Thereza Lemos de Arruda . As plantas medicinais e o sagrado: A etnobotânica em uma revisão historiográfica da medicina popular no Brasil. 1ª ed. São Paulo: Ícone, 2014.

This presents challenges to the pharmacological understanding of how DMT from the plant is rendered orally active as an entheogen, because the psychoactivity of ingested DMT requires the presence of a monoamine oxidase inhibitor (MAOI), such as a β-carboline. If an MAOI is neither present in the plant nor added to the mixture, the enzyme monoamine oxidase (MAO) will metabolize DMT in the human gut, preventing the active molecule from entering the blood and brain.

The plant is also used in clandestine manufacture of crystalline DMT. In this form, it is psychoactive by itself when vaporized and inhaled.

The isolation of the chemical compound yuremamine from Mimosa tenuiflora as reported in 2005 represents a new class of phytoindoles, which may explain an apparent oral activity of DMT in Jurema.

Cultivation

For outside planting, USDA Zone 9 or higher is recommended.

For cultivation, the seed pods are collected once they start to spontaneously open on the tree.  The collected pods are laid out in the sun so that the pods open up and release their seeds.  The seeds can then be planted in sandy soil with sun exposure.

Scarification of the seed via mechanical means or by using sulfuric acid greatly increases the germination rate of the seeds over non-treatment.  The seeds can be sown directly into holes in the ground or planted in prepared areas.

Germination takes about 2–4 weeks.

It is also possible to propagate Mimosa tenuiflora via cuttings.

Trimming adult Mimosa tenuiflorae'' during the rainy season is not recommended as it can cause them to die.

Legal status

United Nations

See also
Dimethyltryptamine
Psychedelic plants

References

External links
 Erowid mimosa page
 Jurema-Preta (Mimosa tenuiflora [Willd.] Poir.): a review of its traditional use, phytochemistry and pharmacology
 

teniflora
Trees of Brazil
Ayahuasca
Entheogens
Forages
Herbal and fungal hallucinogens
Medicinal plants
Psychedelic tryptamine carriers